The 2022 Blood and Guts was the second annual Blood and Guts professional wrestling television special produced by All Elite Wrestling (AEW). It was held on June 29, 2022, at Little Caesars Arena in Detroit, Michigan. The event aired as a special episode of AEW's primary weekly television program, Wednesday Night Dynamite, which aired live on TBS. The July 1 episode of Friday Night Rampage on TNT, which was a special episode titled Royal Rampage, was also taped the same night as Blood and Guts.

Production

Background
On July 25, 2019, World Wrestling Entertainment, Inc. (WWE), as a publicly traded company, conducted a conference call to announce its second-quarter fiscal year 2019 results. During the call, Eric Katz of Wolfe Research, LLC, asked WWE Chairman and Chief Executive Officer (CEO) Vince McMahon questions regarding naming Eric Bischoff and Paul Heyman as Executive Directors to WWE and its relationship to the future of WWE content, especially with stricter Broadcast Standards and Practices at the Fox network for SmackDowns upcoming move to broadcast television. McMahon responded to Katz's question:

The term "blood and guts" used by McMahon was perceived as a reference to rival wrestling promotion All Elite Wrestling (AEW). On November 13, 2019, AEW filed a trademark for "Blood and Guts," a play on McMahon's term. During Revolution on February 29, 2020, AEW announced that the March 25 episode of Dynamite would be subtitled Blood and Guts, and feature the promotion's first WarGames match, billed as a "Blood and Guts match" since the WarGames trademark is owned by WWE. The WarGames match features two rings enclosed by a steel cage and was developed by wrestler Virgil Runnels, better known as "The American Dream" Dusty Rhodes, the father of former AEW executive vice president and in-ring talent Cody Rhodes.

The rules for the Blood and Guts match are based on the classic WarGames format from Jim Crockett Promotions, and not the modern WWE format. The notable format differences between the classic Crockett rules and the modern WWE rules are an enclosed cage with a roof (which was removed in modern versions) and the match can only be won with a submission or surrender.  Like the classic Crockett format, a pin situation is not a win condition.

Storylines
Blood and Guts featured professional wrestling matches that involved different wrestlers from pre-existing scripted feuds and storylines. Wrestlers portrayed heroes, villains, or less distinguishable characters in scripted events that built tension and culminated in a wrestling match or series of matches. Storylines were produced on AEW's weekly television programs, Dynamite and Rampage, the supplementary online streaming shows, Dark and Elevation, and The Young Bucks' YouTube series Being The Elite.

Reception

Television ratings
Blood and Guts averaged 1.023 million television viewers on TBS and a 0.36 rating in AEW's key demographic.

Results

Dynamite (aired June 29)

Rampage (aired July 1)

Royal Rampage match entrances and eliminations

The Royal Rampage match is a two ring 20 man rumble rules battle royale. 10 wrestlers in each ring separately, in which it starts with two wrestlers on each ring, then another wrestler enters in alternating red or blue ring at time intervals every minute. Eliminations by over the top rope. The final two standing wrestlers on each ring will face off on any of the 2 rings under battle royal rules to declare a winner. 

 – Blue Ring
 – Red Ring
 – Winner

Notes

References

External links
All Elite Wrestling Official website

2022 American television episodes
AEW Blood and Guts
All Elite Wrestling shows
Events in Detroit
June 2022 events in the United States
Professional wrestling in Michigan
Professional wrestling in Detroit
2022 in professional wrestling